Kim Suk-soo (born November 20, 1932) is a South Korean politician and attorney-at-law. Kim graduated from Paichai High School in 1952 and Yonsei University in 1956 with a bachelor's degree in law. After his service as a justice of the Supreme Court and chairman of the National Election Commission, Kim became the acting Prime Minister of South Korea from 2002 to 2003, during Kim Dae-Jung’s presidency. On April 25, 2013, he was elected as the head director of Yonsei University after Bang Woo-Young, a former chairman of The Chosun Ilbo, resigned. Kim is also an Of Counsel at  DR & AJU LLC.

References

Prime Ministers of South Korea
Yonsei University alumni
1932 births
Living people
Justices of the Supreme Court of Korea